Route 190, or Highway 190, may refer to:

Canada
 Manitoba Highway 190
 New Brunswick Route 190

Ireland
 R190 regional road

Japan
 Japan National Route 190

United States
 Various spurs designated Interstate 190:
Interstate 190 (Illinois)
Interstate 190 (Massachusetts)
Interstate 190 (New York)
Interstate 190 (South Dakota)
 U.S. Route 190
 Arkansas Highway 190
 California State Route 190
 Connecticut Route 190
 Florida State Road 190
 Georgia State Route 190
 Hawaii Route 190
 Illinois Route 190 (former)
 K-190 (Kansas highway)
 Kentucky Route 190
 Maine State Route 190
 Maryland Route 190
 Massachusetts Route 190 (former)
 Minnesota State Highway 190 (former)
 Missouri Route 190
 New Mexico State Road 190
 New York State Route 190
 Ohio State Route 190
 Pennsylvania Route 190 (former)
 Tennessee State Route 190
 Texas State Highway 190
 Texas State Highway Spur 190
 Farm to Market Road 190 (Texas)
 Utah State Route 190
 Virginia State Route 190
 Wisconsin Highway 190
 Wyoming Highway 190
Territories
 Puerto Rico Highway 190